International Association of Sports Law (IASL) is an international scientific association founded during the 1st International Congress on Sports Law, 11–13 December 1992 in Athens and seated in Olympia, Greece. Since then IASL is activated as far as administrative matters are concerned in Athens and in its President’s country of origin.

Objective

The objective of IASL is the cultivation and the development of the Science, the research and the teaching of Sports Law and the institution of the Olympic Games. The studies, the collection of the international sports jurisprudence, programming and consultative in the legislative, administrative, organizational and practical section of Sports Law and the institution of the Olympic Games, are the aims of the Association.

Members

IASL members may be natural and/or legal persons actively participating in the research, teaching and practical application of Sports Law as well as the institution of the Olympic Games.

Whoever is interested in becoming member of IASL is asked to fill in an application form. The annual membership fee depends on the member’s status, according to the relevant categorization of the above application form. Current President of IASL is Dimitrios Panagiotopoulos (Assoc. Professor, University of Athens, Advocate, President of Hellenic Center of Research on Sports Law (H.C.R.S.L.), 13 Veranzerou St., 10677 Athens, Greece).

Congress
IASL has already organized more than 15th Congresses. The latest ones and the upcoming, 14th International Congress that will take place in Athens, are:

14th International Congress
14th International Congress will take place at the University of Athens, Central Building (where I.A.S.L was founded in 1992 and at the Hotel “TITANIA", from Friday 28 November 2008 to Saturday 29 November 2008. The Congress languages will be English, French and Greek. The texts of the 14th World IASL Congress as well as the Findings of the Congress will be published by the HCRSL (EKEAD) in a special edition (Proceedings) and some elected papers will be published in the International Sports Law Review/Pandektis.

13th International Congress
The Congress took place in the main auditorium of Torre del Caballito, at Mexico City which is the place that members of the Senate of the Mexican Republic work in these offices, from Wednesday 14 November to Thursday 15 November 2007. General Topics were Sports Legal Order, Sports Law Regulation, National Sports Law, Conflicts of Sports Jurisdiction, Arbitration of Sports Disputes, Violence and Racism in Sports, Doping, Sports Law Cases.

12th International Congress
The 12th IASL Conference on Legal Aspects of Professional Sports was held from 23–25 November 2006 in Ljubljana. The conference was attended by most members of the Board of Directors and many members of the IASL. Over the two days of the conference proceedings (Friday 24 and Saturday 25 November) 22 speakers addressed the conference, providing an in-depth presentation of developments in the academic discipline of sports law and the wider are of law which touches upon sporting and competitive activities from both an international viewpoint and the national perspective of the legal order the speakers represented.

11th International Congress
The 11th IASL Congress has successfully taken place in Johannesburg, South Africa, 28–30 November 2005 dealt with the general topic: "Fighting Abuse in Sports". The various topics for discussion were: Child Abuse in Sport, Unfair Discrimination, Hooliganism, Ambush Marketing and Commercial Exploitation of Athletes, Doping, Drug Abuse and Genetic engineering
Politics and Sport.

10th International Congress
The 10th IASL Conference on Legal Aspects of Professional Sports was 25–27 November 2004 in Athens. Organized in Athens in a time of great relevance, the 10th International Congress on Sports Law, features on “Sports Law: Implementation and the Olympic Games”.

9th International Congress
The 9th IASL Congress has successfully taken place in Milwaukee, Wisconsin U.S.A. on 25–26 September 2003 dealt with the general topic: "International Sports Law and Business in the 21st Century". The sessions dealt with the following topics: Sports Facility Financing, Development and Safety, Olympic and European Sports Stadium Issues, International Player Restraints and Competition Law, Drug Testing in Sports, Resolution of Sports Disputes, Acquisition, Sale & Movement of Sports Franchises in a Global Environment, Athlete Rights Issues.

Sports Law Publications
IASL members publish their books, articles  and studies based on sports law. Articles regarding the Sports relations (in the national and international level), and the sports organizations (their legal status and the law that governs their function), are also published. Studies about the labor relations in athletics and articles concerning the law of the Olympic Games are included in the volumes of the International Sports Law Review «Pandektis», as well.

Pandektis
The Official Journal of IASL is “International Sports Law Review Pandektis”, published twice per year and bound as a volume every two years. Is directed by an Editorial Committee presided by Dimitrios Panagiotopoulos Asst. Professor, University of Athens. Pandektis basic goal is to communicate and deliver a scientific message of the emerge Science of Sports Law. Until now, there have been published seven volumes of ISLR Pandektis.

Latest volume contains several articles on current issues of the science of sports law (e.g. a paper concerning the rules of the new FIFA Regulations for the status and transfer of players), as well as articles on fundamental subjects of sports law (such as an article about the nature of the international sports legal order Lex Sportiva and its relation to the national ones). It contains also recent judgments of the ECJ, orders and awards of the CAS, as well as an announcement of IASL.

References

Further reading
Bulletin Information I
Bulletin Information II

Sports law